Asha Sharath (born 19 July 1974) is an Indian actress and classical dancer, who predominantly works in Malayalam films and television shows and also has a few Tamil, Kannada and Telugu film credits.

Personal life

Asha is married to Sharath Varier since 11 September 1995. Asha was born to V. S. Krishnan Kutty Nair and Kalamandalam Sumathi, a classical dancer. She started learning dance at the age of three. She graduated from Sree Sankara College Kalady
Asha came to Dubai in 1995, following her marriage with T V Sharath. They have two daughters Uthara and Keerthana. They are settled in Dubai, UAE.

Career
Asha Sharath started her acting career through Malayalam television serials such as Jathaka Kathakal and Mikhayelinte Santhathikal. Kumkumapoovu made her popular. Her first feature film was Friday. She has also appeared in Karmayodha, Ardha Nari. Her role in Drishyam as an IPS officer was very well acclaimed.

Filmography

Films

Television

Awards
 Kerala Film Critics Association Awards
 2014: Best Actress for Varsham

 Filmfare Awards South
 2014: Best Supporting Actress for Drishyam
 2016: Best Supporting Actress for Anuraga Karikkin Vellam

References

External links
 
 

Actresses in Malayalam television
Indian television actresses
People from Ernakulam district
Living people
Actresses in Telugu cinema
Actresses in Malayalam cinema
Actresses in Tamil cinema
21st-century Indian actresses
Actresses from Kochi
Dancers from Kerala
Indian female dancers
21st-century Indian dancers
21st-century Indian women artists
Indian film actresses
Artists from Kochi
Women artists from Kerala
1974 births